The  was a group based in Osaka from 1930 until 1941 that promoted avant-garde and, toward the end, socially concerned photography.

The group was founded around the photographer Bizan Ueda, among photographers who bought their supplies from the Tampei Pharmacy (Tanpei yakkyoku) in Shinsaibashi, Osaka. The founding members included Terushichi Hirai, Kōrō Honjō and Tōru Kōno; these were soon augmented by Kaneyoshi Tabuchi, Nakaji Yasui, and others.

The group's first exhibition was held in 1931 but it was the second exhibition, in 1932, that caused a stir, with avant-garde works. The club exhibited frequently; its first exhibition in Tokyo held in 1935.

The club's 23rd exhibition, in March 1941, featured a series titled Refugee Jews (Ryūbō Yudaya) of 22 photographs depicted exiles from eastern Europe who were living in Kobe. Six of these were by Yasui, who had instigated two photography sessions for it earlier that month. The club was forced to close later that year.

The club reemerged after the war, but did not regain its prominence.

Notes

References

Nihon shashinka jiten (328 Outstanding Japanese Photographers). Kyoto: Tankōsha, 2000. .  P. 346.
Tanjō hyakunen: Yasui Nakaji: Shashin no subete (誕生百年：安井仲治写真：写真のすべて) / Nakaji Yasui 1903–1942: The Photography. 2004. No publisher specified, but presumably one or more of the Shoto Museum of Art (Tokyo), the Nagoya City Art Museum (Nagoya), and Kyodo News (Tokyo); the first two hosted a centenary exhibition of Yasui's works.  Paperback. Also: Yasui Nakaji shashinshū (安井仲治写真集) / Nakaji Yasui: Photographer 1903–1942. Tokyo: Kyodo News, 2004. . Hardback. The catalogue for the Shoto/Nagoya exhibition of 2004/2005; text in both Japanese and English. Despite their different titles, the two books seem to be virtually identical.
Tucker, Anne Wilkes, et al. The History of Japanese Photography. New Haven: Yale University Press, 2003. . Pp. 375.

Japanese photography organizations
Arts organizations established in 1930
Culture in Osaka